Sclerolobium striatum is a species of legume in the family Fabaceae.
It is found only in Brazil.

References

Caesalpinioideae
Flora of Brazil
Vulnerable plants
Taxonomy articles created by Polbot